Amy Walker is an American actress and singer.

Early life
She studied acting and singing at the University of Wollongong. She settled in Wellington and played Joan in the short film Dead Letters.

Career 
Walker voiced Lunara in Heroes of the Storm and various characters in Fallout 76 (Miss Nanny, Beverly Solomon, Dorothy Orris, and Mawmaw). She created a YouTube video 21 Accents, which earned her appearances on both The Today Show and Inside Edition. She also partnered with Nokia as an accent expert to promote their Foreign Accent Cup.

Walker performed her first original one-woman show, Amy Walker: Inside Out, in November 2007 and has since created three other original shows onstage and online.

In 2019, Amy Walker filmed two feature films, Evan Wood and Grace and Grit, both of which were released in late 2020. She also voiced Emi Terasawa in the video game, Judgment.

She learned how to paint in college. She has stated that although she only does it as a hobby, she also sells some of her paintings online.

Discography
Discourse on Accents (Third Man Records, 2011)

Awards

References

External links

American stage actresses
American expatriate actors in New Zealand
Living people
Actresses from Seattle
21st-century American actresses
University of Wollongong alumni
American YouTubers
21st-century American singers
21st-century American women singers
YouTube vloggers
Year of birth missing (living people)